Trihi  is a former locality in the Australian state of South Australia located in the state's south east about  south-east of the state capital of Adelaide and about  north-east of the municipal seat in Millicent.

Trihi was assigned a locality name under the Geographical Names Act 1991 in 1997 with revised boundaries being gazetted in 2001.  It was named after Trihi Lagoon.  It was abolished on 26 November 2015 and the land within was divided between the localities of Kalangadoo and Mount McIntyre.

The 2011 Australian Census which was conducted in August 2011 and which was the last conducted for Trihi before its abolition reports that it shared a population of 519 people with other localities in the area described as the State Suburb of Kalangadoo by the Australian Bureau of Statistics.  However, another source suggests a population as low as a "dozen or so families".

At the time of its abolition, Trihi was located within the federal division of Barker, the state electoral district of MacKillop and the local government area of the Wattle Range Council.

References

Towns in South Australia
Resumed localities in Australia